Minsk Tractor Works (MTZ) is a Belarusian agricultural machinery manufacturer with headquarters in Minsk, Belarus. Minsk Tractor Works is one of the main tractor factories in the country. It is a part of the Minsk Tractor Works Industrial Association. In addition to the main plant in Minsk, the association includes a number of plants that produce parts and attachable tools for tractors and other vehicles produced by MTZ.

History

The plant was established on 29 May 1946. The first tractor, the MTZ-2 model, was manufactured on October 14, 1953.

As of 2005, it had nearly 20,000 workers. The plant produces over 62 models of vehicles. Its main civil production has been four-wheeled tractors of model "MTZ", known as Belarus. By 1995 the plant had manufactured 3,000,000 tractors. In 1999, it produced 58% of all tractors manufactured in the CIS. In 2017, its share in the production of wheel tractors in CIS countries was 87%. 
 
MTZ tractors were exported to Western Europe, too.

In 2013, the plant tractors were certified in the US by the Environment Protection Agency (EPA) and in Canada by Environment Canada and received full approval for their import and distribution in both countries. Since 2010, distribution of Belarus tractors in the US and Canada is carried on through a local distributor, MTZ Equipment Ltd.

In 2015, MTZ produced 2,424 tractors, an increase of 45% compared to the previous year (1,648 tractors).

In 2017, 92.1% tractors of 31,011 produced were exported. Eight countries imported more than 500 "Belarus" tractors: Russia (11,135), Pakistan (4,845), Ukraine (4,028), Kazakhstan (2,106), Azerbaijan (1,637), Hungary (871), Romania (812), Lithuania (736).

In 2020, after the Presidential elections, police brutality, and the mass torture of protesters, the workers of MTZ joined the national strike and opposition.

Products

Tractors

Belarus-80.1; Belarus-82.1; Belarus-90; Belarus-92; Belarus-320; Belarus-310; Belarus-321; Belarus-422; Belarus-510; Belarus, 512; Belarus-520; Belarus-522; Belarus-572; Belarus-622; Belarus-820; Belarus-826; Belarus-892; Belarus-920; Belarus-922.3; Belarus-923.3; Belarus-1021; Belarus-Belarus-1025.2 1220.3; Belarus-1221.2; Belarus-1523; Belarus-2022.3; Belarus-3022DTS.1; Belarus-3522.

Special tractors
Belarus-80X; Belarus-100X; Belarus-920R; Belarus-921.3; BELARUS-921.4-10 / 91.

Associated plants
 MTZ plant
 Сморгоньский агрегатный завод, Smarhon mechanical unit plant
 Бобруйский завод тракторных деталей и агрегатов, Babruysk tractor part and mechanical unit plant
 Витебский завод тракторных запчастей, Vitsebsk tractor part plant
 Минский завод специнструмента и технологической оснастки, Minsk instrument and auxiliaries plant
 Минский завод шестерён, Minsk gear plant
 Лепельский электромеханический завод, Lepel electromechanical plant
 Смолевичский завод шестерён, Smalyavichy gear plant
 Гомельский завод «Гидропривод», Gomel hydraulic drive plant
 Завод гидроаппаратуры в г. Хойники, Khoyniki hydraulic drive plant
 Наровлянский завод гидроаппаратуры, Narowlya hydraulic drive plant
 Мозырский машиностроительный завод, Mazyr machine-building plant
 Saint Petersburg

Joint assembly production of MTZ tractors began in 2013 in Cambodia, at MTZ's first assembly plant in the ASEAN region. Tractors are now exported to all ASEAN countries.

Sport, Media, and Culture 
Until 2010 Minsk Tractor Works was a sponsor of a Belarusian Premier League football team MTZ-RIPO Minsk. Games were played at Traktor stadium, which is located near the plant.

The Palace of Culture of the plant hosts the ballroom Dance Club Mara.

During the 2022 Russian invasion of Ukraine, A video showed a Belarus-82.1 pulling a captured Russian MT-LB.

Gallery

References

External links 

Belarusian Machine Building: Once a Nation's Pride, Now a Burden?
Belarus: putting Russia on the right tractor – archive, 1988

Tractor manufacturers of Belarus
Companies of Belarus
Belarusian brands
Buildings and structures in Minsk
Organizations based in Minsk
Economy of Minsk
Companies established in 1946
1946 establishments in Belarus
Agriculture companies of the Soviet Union
Buildings and structures built in the Soviet Union